Bestseller A/S is a privately held family-owned clothing and accessories company founded in Denmark in 1975. The company provides affordable fashion for women, men and children. They market their products in 70 markets across most of Europe, the Middle East, Canada, India and globally via E-commerce. They operate almost 9,000 shops worldwide, 6,000 in China and the rest mainly in Europe.

History
The company was founded in 1975 by Troels Holch Povlsen in Brande, Denmark. Originally its focus was on women's fashion. It introduced children's clothing in 1986 and menswear in 1988. Bestseller is family-owned and the company employs around 17,000 people.

Brands
Bestseller has a number of different brands under which it sells its clothing. The brands are listed below and are sold both in the company's own stores and through independent retailers.

Women's clothing
 ONLY – Bestseller's largest brand, young female fashion
Vero Moda – The company's basic brand of women's clothing. In 2007, the company hired the supermodel Gisele Bündchen to promote the brand in 2007–08.
 Mamalicious – maternity wear
 VILA – for younger women
 SELECTED Femme – sister brand to Selected Homme
 Junarose – plus size
 Y.A.S
 Noisy May
 PIECES
 Object
Jacqueline de Yong
Jack & Jones
produkt
JJXX - Bestseller's newest, young female brand

Menswear

 Jack & Jones – brand targeted at younger customers, with underwear and other garments. In 2007, the company established a new label "JJ ECO" which is Fairtrade-certified. They sponsor Danish sportsmen Mikkel Kessler and Kevin Magnussen, as well as Danish ESports team Astralis and American Formula One team Haas F1 Team.
 Selected Homme – contemporary menswear label, including tailored suits and shirts
 Outfitters Nation – targeted at teenagers, later changed to LMTD.
 Only&Sons

Children's clothing
 Name It – clothes for babies and children.

Other
 Normal – personal and homecare hygiene store (25% share) [in Denmark, Norway, Sweden, the Netherlands and France].

Retail stores

Bestseller has shops in most European countries, the Middle East, India, China, Uruguay, and Canada (over 45 countries in total). Bestseller is one of the biggest European fashion companies in China with more than 1,200 shops and is said to be "one of the only foreign clothing companies successful at penetrating the middle price range Chinese consumer market". Shops sell either clothing of one single brand or of all brands of the company. There are more than 800 shops selling Vero Moda around the globe. The Jack & Jones brand is sold in approximately 2,000 retail shops, of which 270 are Jack & Jones franchises.

Stakes in other retailers

Bestseller, via its parent holding company Heartland, is the largest shareholder at 29.5% of British e-commerce firm ASOS.com, and owns 10% of German retailer Zalando. In July 2018, Heartland invested $300m in German fashion startup About You.

In November 2012, Bestseller bought 10% of SmartGuy Group, when they became quoted on the Danish stock exchange Nasdaq OMX.

Bestseller Tower 
Bestseller Tower was a planned high-rise building in Brande, a rural town in Denmark. The proposed 320-metre (1,050 ft) skyscraper would house the headquarters of fashion company Bestseller and was announced in 2017 with a design by Dorte Mandrup. The tower was scheduled to be completed in 2023 and would have been the tallest building in Western Europe. In 2020 the project was shelved by the company.

References

External links
Official website

Clothing companies of Denmark
Clothing brands of Denmark
Danish brands
Danish companies established in 1975
Clothing retailers of Denmark